Michael Rothwell may refer to:

Michael Rothwell (actor) (1936–2009), British character actor
Michael Rothwell (sailor) (born 1953), American sailor